Tabourot is a surname. Notable people with the surname include:

 Étienne Tabourot (1549–1590), French jurist, writer and poet
 Jehan Tabourot, birth name of Thoinot Arbeau (1519–1595), French cleric and writer

See also
 Taboret, type of furniture